Pyarali Merali (born December 1930) is an architect from Uganda. He was known as "One of the best architects of our time.". He moved to Karachi, Pakistan where in less than a decade he had worked on over 300 projects including schools, residences, banks, offices and sports facilities. His firm was very well known and where many architects launched their careers. He left his firm in the hands of two brothers after departing to Canada. The firm is now known as ASA. One of the biggest and best architect practices in Pakistan.

References

1930 births
Ugandan artists
20th-century architects
Date of birth missing (living people)
Living people
Place of birth missing (living people)